The Fourche LaFave River Bridge carries Arkansas Highway 7 across the Fourche LaFave River in western Perry County, Arkansas, downstream of the Nimrod Dam. The arches are mounted on concrete abutments and piers. The bridge deck is asphalt, and is lined by ornate concrete balustrades. It was built in 1941 by the Luten Bridge Company, and is a well-preserved example of style from that period.

The bridge was listed on the National Register of Historic Places in 1995.

See also
Wallace Bridge: a historic bridge over the Fourche La Fave River
Ward's Crossing Bridge: a historic bridge over the Fourche La Fave River
List of bridges documented by the Historic American Engineering Record in Arkansas
List of bridges on the National Register of Historic Places in Arkansas
National Register of Historic Places listings in Perry County, Arkansas

References

External links

Historic American Engineering Record in Arkansas
Road bridges on the National Register of Historic Places in Arkansas
Bridges completed in 1941
National Register of Historic Places in Perry County, Arkansas
Concrete bridges in the United States
Open-spandrel deck arch bridges in the United States
1941 establishments in Arkansas
Luten bridges
Bridge